Cecil White may refer to:

 Cecil F. White (1900–1992), American politician
 Cecil White (footballer) (1860–1948), England international footballer
 Unk White (Cecil John White, 1900–1986), Australian cartoonist

See also